Face to Face with David is a Canadian television talk show, which premiered in 2020 on Amazon Prime Video. Hosted by actor David Oulton, the show features Oulton interviewing celebrities, through videoconferencing software due to the COVID-19 pandemic in Canada.

The show has been characterized as an LGBTQ-oriented talk show, as Oulton is openly gay and several of his early guests were also members of the LGBTQ community, although Oulton has clarified that the show is not limited to LGBTQ people or topics. The show was launched as a casual project through Oulton's social media profiles, before being picked up by Amazon Prime after a month.

In May 2021, the series was picked up for broadcast in Canada by OutTV. In June 2021, Corus Entertainment began airing the series on Slice. It began airing on the Oprah Winfrey Network and DejaView in Canada in August 2021. It is also available to stream on StackTV.

In South Africa the series is available on Showmax, TVNZ in New Zealand, and various other networks globally.

In 2022, alongside its renewal of the show for a fifth season, OutTV also announced the acquisition of Who's There?, a panel talk show in which Oulton moderates a roundtable discussion between various guests.

In December 2022, the series became available in the United States on Amazon Freevee, Roku, Tubi and various other video on demand platforms.

Awards 
The series received a nomination for Best Lifestyle or Information series at the 47th annual Rosie Awards, presented by the Alberta Media Production Industries Association.

David Oulton received a nomination for Best Host at the 48th annual Rosie Awards for his interview on the Season 4 premiere episode with Raven Symone and her wife Miranda Maday.

References



2020 Canadian television series debuts
Amazon Prime Video original programming
OutTV (Canadian TV channel) original programming
2020s Canadian television talk shows
2020s Canadian LGBT-related television series
Television shows filmed in Calgary